Peter Browne, 2nd Earl of Altamont (c. 1731 - 28 December 1780) was an Irish landowner, absentee slaveholder and MP.

He was the son of John Browne, 1st Earl of Altamont, and Anne Gore. He married Elizabeth Kelly, the only legitimate child and heiress of Denis Kelly, on 16 April 1752. Denis (or Dennis) Kelly was Chief Justice of Jamaica and the Brownes inherited the Jamaican slave plantations as well as Lisduff estate and Spring Garden estate, both in the civil parish of Tynagh, Barony of Leitrim (County Galway). The townland of Lisduff exceeds 264 acres while the townland of Spring Garden exceeds 275 acres. 

The Lisduff estate was acquired from Denis Kelly's brother, Edmond Kelly. The estate was enlarged by land purchases in the townland of Drumatober (also in the Barony of Leitrim, Abbeygormacan civil parish) and Garrancarf in 1749, and of the lands of Cormickoge from John Burke in 1750. 

He adopted the additional surname of Kelly. Elizabeth Kelly's half-sister, Priscilla Kelly, married Robert Cooper Lee, Crown Solicitor-General of Jamaica. Their daughter, Favell Bourke Lee, married David Bevan, a British banker of Barclay, Bevan, Bennin, Tritton (forerunners of Barclays Bank DCO). This united several aristocratic families of Britain.

Peter Browne was elected Member of Parliament for Mayo in the Parliament of Ireland for 1761 to 1768.

Issue 
 Charlotte, died 23 January 1849
 John Denis Browne, 1st Marquess of Sligo
 Denis Browne (politician)
 Elizabeth, c. 1765-1795
 Anne, Countess of Desart, Viscountess Desart, Viscountess Castlecuffe, Baroness Desart (c. 1765–1814), married Otway Cuffe, 1st Earl of Desart

References

Politicians from County Mayo
1730s births
1780 deaths
Peter
Irish MPs 1761–1768
Irish slave owners
Members of the Parliament of Ireland (pre-1801) for County Mayo constituencies
Earls of Altamont